Horná Štubňa is a village and municipality in Turčianske Teplice District in the Žilina Region of northern central Slovakia.

History
In historical records the village was first mentioned in 1390. The village belonged to a German language island. The German population was expelled in 1945.

Geography
The municipality lies at an altitude of 627 metres and covers an area of 31.388 km2. It has a population of about 1,610 people.

Famous people
Emília Vášáryová, actress

Genealogical resources

The records for genealogical research are available at the state archive "Statny Archiv in Bytca, Slovakia"

 Roman Catholic church records (births/marriages/deaths): 1737-1919 (parish A)
 Lutheran church records (births/marriages/deaths): 1820-1923 (parish B)

See also
 List of municipalities and towns in Slovakia

References

External links

Villages and municipalities in Turčianske Teplice District